Az Zulfi (also Zulfi,  Zulfy City or Al Zulfi or Az Zilfi) is a city in Riyadh Province in central Saudi Arabia, about 260 kilometres northwest of Riyadh. It is connected by Roads 418 and 535 which both link with the main Highway 65 which connects Riyadh to Buraidah which is about 101 kilometres by road to west of Al Zulfi. Zulfi also forms a governorate of Riyadh Province. The Al-Yamama/Tuwaiq mountain range begins in the desert to the north of Al Zulfi.

Location
Az Zulfi is in the East of Al-Qassim Province and at the heart of the historical region of Najd. It is located roughly 70kilometers from Buraydah (the capital of the province) and more than 290 kilometers north of the Saudi capital, Riyadh.

History

Early history
Although the location is sometimes identified with an ancient settlement mentioned by Yaqut and Al-Hamadani known as Oryarh, the history of Zulfi proper dates back to the third century. According to the chroniclers of Nejd.

Hajr served as the capital of the province of Al Yamamah, whose governors were responsible for most of central and eastern Arabia during the Umayyad and Abbasid eras. Al-Yamamah broke away from the Abbasid Empire in 866 and the area fell under the rule of the Ukhaydhirites, who moved the capital from Hajr to nearby Al Kharj. The city then went into a long period of decline. In the 14th century, North African traveller Ibn Battuta wrote of his visit to Hajr, describing it as "the main city of Al-Yamamah, and its name is Hajr". Ibn Battuta goes on to describe it as a city of canals and trees with most of its inhabitants belonging to Bani Hanifa, and reports that he continued on with their leader to Mecca to perform the Hajj.

Later on, Hajr broke up into several separate settlements and estates.  The most notable of these were Migrin (or Muqrin) and Mi'kal, though the name Hajr continued to appear in local folk poetry.  The earliest known reference to the area by the name Riyadh comes from a 17th-century chronicler reporting on an event from the year 1590. In 1737, Deham ibn Dawwas, a refugee from neighboring Manfuha, took control of Riyadh. Ibn Dawwas built a single wall to encircle the various quarters of Riyadh, making them effectively a single town.

The three Saudi states

And dating to the late 19th century Zulfi architecture XI Hijri approximately 1090 e by alasaadh clan of Talha with thigh elrokh by tribe Otaiba known (Al rashd and lfrahid) of offspring Rashid Mohammed and Saleh Rashid sons farhud Assadi. The Principality llasaadh to Crown modern and recorded some dates old Al-Najdiyah events and facts to them and had them thanks in helping reconstruction and received from them a lot of development and progress in all fields and areas, and saw them through major Renaissance and strong growth over the last decade gained admiration from her family and many surrounding cities and has been and continues to be a beacon and example role models, to join all efforts together and one collective spirit and generations believed for years and now need to move seriously towards Access to refineries and Zulfi mattresses delivered social progress and civilization

Battle of Sabilla
The Battle of Sabilla (March 29, 1929) was the main battle of the Ikhwan Revolt in northern Arabia between the rebellious Ikhwan forces and the army of Ibn Saud. It was the last major battle, where one side rode camels, as the Ikhwan emphasized radical conservatism, shunned technological modernization. The rebellious, but technologically mediocre, Ikhwan were decisively defeated by the Saudi forces, which included machine-guns and cavalry. Faisal al-Dawish, one of the three leaders of the rebellious Ikhwan tribes, was wounded in the battle. According to Ibn Saud Information Resource, his injury was "serious". Sultan bin Bajad, allegedly fled the battle scene.

On January 9, 2005, Saudi forces reportedly killed four gunmen in a gun battle in Al Zulfi. Three security officials were injured in the event.
Senior al-Qaeda leader Khalid al-Juwayr was captured by the security forces in al-Zulfi.

Geography
Al Zulfi lies in the northern-central region of the Najd and to the south of the Sheayb Samnan (Samnan Valley), which is the longest valley on the Zulfi. It is surrounded by sand dunes to its north and west, which are known locally as the Al-Thoyr Sands. The Al-sabalh Woods are located to the north of the city. Next to Al Zulfi is the Al-Kasar Rain lake (or Bohyrat Al-Kasar), which is considered an official part of the city.

Climate
Being in the middle of the Arabian desert, Al Zulfi experiences extremely hot summers and relatively cool winters. Humidity is low though throughout the year. The minimum temperature in the summer ranges between 35 and 42 degrees Celsius. The species Bunopus spatalurus spatalurus of the Bunopus genus of small geckos was described in 1991 as being endemic to the area.

In Al Zulfi, there is a desert climate. Most rain falls in the winter. The Köppen-Geiger climate classification is BWh. About  of precipitation falls annually.

Notable landmarks
Al Zulfi contains numerous mosques and parks. It also contains a 150-bed hospital and the Palace of Prince Saud bin Abdul-Aziz bin Muhammad bin Saud. The Al Zulfi Governorate contains 2 national parks. Al-Zulfi has three artificial lakes due to the problems of water salinization. Al Zulfi is noted for its many wells and fertile soils with many thousands of acres of land under cultivation. There are also coal reserves in the area, especially in the northeast near Qasim. The thickness of the deposits range from 5 to 50 metres and are spread over a vast area with some 66 coal mines discovered in the Qassim area by the early 1980s.

Renovations and development plans
Among the rebuilt structures are the bath and guest house, the Qasr Nasr, the Nasr bin Saud Palace and Al Aqlah.

Notable people
Abdullah al-Tariki - First Saudi oil minister and co-founder of Organization of Petroleum Exporting Countries (OPEC)
Othman Al Omeir - Journalist, editor, and businessman, founder of first daily Arab independent on-line newspaper, Elaph, and former editor of the London-based weekly The Majalla and daily Al Sharq Al Awsat.
Abdulrahman al Rashed - Journalist, editor, general manager of Al Arabiya Channels and former editor of Al Sharq Al Awsat.
Rashid Mohammed Al Fawzan - General manager of CNBC Arabiya and economic analyst and a columnist in Al Riyadh and Al Eqtisadiah newspapers.
Saleh Al Hammadi - Former editor of  Alriyadiah Sport Newspaper, sport columnist and TV personality.
Abdullah bin Abdur-Rahaan al-Ghudayan -religious figure 
Abdulrahman Alfuraih -Lawyer, and legal consultant.

See also

 Najd
List of cities and towns in Saudi Arabia
 Regions of Saudi Arabia

References

External links
Official website
Video
Video
Video
Video

Populated places in Riyadh Province
Spas